Kuran-e Olya (also Romanized as Kūrān-e ‘Olyā, Kooran Olya, Kūrān-e ‘Oleyā, and Kūrān ‘Olyā; also known as Kūrān-e Bālā) is a village in Damen Rural District, in the Central District of Iranshahr County, Sistan and Baluchestan Province, Iran. At the 2006 census, its population was 641, in 132 families.

References 

Populated places in Iranshahr County